William Wallace Kimball (1828–1904) was the founder of the company now known as Kimball International.

Biography
Kimball was born in Rumford, Maine on March 22, 1828. He moved to Decorah, Iowa, in his mid-twenties and became a real estate broker. He liquidated his investments just before the Panic of 1857 and moved to Chicago.

In 1857 he also founded the Kimball Piano Company, beginning with only four pianos. He sold these at a profit and progressed from there, selling pianos manufactured in the east and shipped to his store. Before the Great Chicago Fire, he had a store in the Crosby Opera House. His place of business was destroyed in the fire, and he lost over $100,000.

He later moved to State and Adams Streets. He married Evalyne M. Cove in 1865. In 1877, Kimball decided to manufacture his own pianos to keep down the cost of the final product. In 1881, he opened his own factory and began churning out around 100 pianos and organs every week.  Kimball Avenue (3400W) is named after him.

Kimball died at his home in Chicago on December 16, 1904. He is buried at Graceland Cemetery in Chicago.

References

1828 births
1904 deaths
People from Rumford, Maine
Businesspeople from Maine
19th-century American businesspeople